This is a list of all the United States Supreme Court cases from volume 550 (2006–2007) of the United States Reports:

External links

2007 in United States case law